Le Gué-de-Longroi is a commune in the Eure-et-Loir department in northern France.

Population

Personalities
Jean Todt, former co-pilot, director of Scuderia Ferrari.

See also
Communes of the Eure-et-Loir department

References

Communes of Eure-et-Loir